Anazocine (INN; also known as azabicyclane or CS-307) is an opioid analgesic of the morphan/benzomorphan family developed in the middle 1960s in the United States which was never marketed.  It is listed by some sources as a teratogen.

The structure and properties of several related α- and β-azabicyclane opioids was explored. Anazocine's chemical and structural relatives include opioid partial agonists, mixed agonist-antagonists, pure agonists, antagonists, and atypical non-opioid analgesics.  It was tested in pigeons and in other experiments which contrasted and compared its analgesic effects to those of the phenazepine opioid ethoheptazine and the phenalkoxam open chain opioid propoxyphene, and pethidine as well.

See also 
 Benzomorphan

References 

Analgesics
Opioids